The 2021–22 season was the 19th season for FC Barcelona Femení B, and their 3rd season in the new format of Segunda División Pro aka Reto Iberdrola.

Players

Current squad

Youth team

Technical staff

Transfers

Competitions

Segunda División Pro (Group North)

League table

Matches

Statistics

References 

2021–22 in Spanish women's football
Spanish football clubs 2021–22 season